The Sting is a 1973 film starring Paul Newman and Robert Redford.

The Sting may also refer to:

 The Sting (1992 film), a Hong Kong action comedy film
 "The Sting" (Futurama), a 2003 episode of the series
 The Sting (Gabriella Cilmi album), or the title track, 2013
 The Sting (musical), based on the 1973 film
 "The Sting" (The Office), a 2010 episode of the series
 The Sting (Wu-Tang Clan album), 2002
 "The Sting", a 1986 episode of the TV series Lovejoy
 "The Sting" (Only Murders in the Building), a 2021 episode of the TV series Only Murders in the Building
 "The Sting", a 2013 episode of the TV series the Legend of Korra

Other uses
 The Sting!, a 2001 single player burglary simulator
 WBWC, an American college radio station branded 88.3 FM The Sting

See also
Sting (disambiguation)